OTO Award TV News Reporter

Currently held by  Leona Kočkovičová

First awarded  | Last awarded 2012 | Present  

OTO Award for TV News Reporter has been awarded since the 13th edition of the accolades, established by Art Production Agency (APA) in Slovakia in 2000. Each year, the award has been presented to the most recognized television reporters in the news program of the past year with the ceremony permitted live by the national television network STV.

Winners and nominees

2010s

Superlatives

Notes
Ž Denotes also a winner of the Život Award.

References

External links
 OTO Awards (Official website)
 OTO Awards - Winners and nominees (From 2000 onwards)
 OTO Awards - Winners and nominees (From 2000 to 2009)

News reporter
Slovak culture
Slovak television awards
Awards established in 2000